Eagles Live is the first live album by the American rock band Eagles, a two-LP set released on November 7, 1980. Although the Eagles were already in the process of breaking up, the band owed Elektra/Asylum Records one more album and fulfilled that contractual obligation with a release of performances from the Hotel California and The Long Run tours.

Eagles Live was mixed by Glenn Frey and Don Henley on opposite coasts in Los Angeles and Miami, respectively, and as producer Bill Szymczyk put it, the record's harmony and instrument fixes were made "courtesy of Federal Express." The 1983 Rolling Stone Record Guide said it is "perhaps the most heavily overdubbed [live album] in history." "Seven Bridges Road," a Steve Young cover, was released as a single and became a top-40 hit.

Recording 
Five of the tracks were recorded in October 1976, during three performances at The Forum in Inglewood, California. The other ten tracks were recorded in July 1980, from three shows at the Santa Monica Civic Auditorium and one at the Long Beach Arena in California. The band had different line-ups in 1976 and 1980; Timothy B. Schmit joined in 1978, replacing original bassist Randy Meisner.  Five lead singers are featured in the 14 vocal songs on the album [excluding the brief musical interlude of "Doolin Dalton (Reprise II)"]: Henley, Frey, Joe Walsh, Meisner and Schmit. Songs from each Eagles studio album except one (On the Border) are included, as well as two Walsh solo tracks and one cover song: the acoustic harmony-laden "Seven Bridges Road."

Plagued for years by internal strife, the band had reached a breaking point by July 31, 1980, when The Long Run tour concluded with a concert in Long Beach, California, that served as a fund-raiser for then-Senator Alan Cranston's campaign. The version of "Life in the Fast Lane" for Eagles Live was recorded at this show, which was most notable for a dispute between bandmates Frey and Don Felder that culminated backstage, when they nearly came to blows. Frey then refused to even speak to the other band members, let alone join them to record overdubs for Eagles Live; therefore, the recording was done piecemeal. Frey was in Los Angeles while the rest of the band was in Miami, with Henley overseeing the post-production sessions. Tapes were sent back and forth between the two locations until the album was completed. Szymczyk said: "I had my assistant in Los Angeles with Glenn, and I had the rest of the band fly to Miami. We were fixing three-part harmonies courtesy of Federal Express."  Five different lawyers were thanked in the liner notes.

The Eagles rejected a $2 million offer from the label to record two new songs for the album.  The only previously unreleased song in the album is a version of "Seven Bridges Road".  The song was a showcase for the band's close harmony singing, as the verses of the song feature a cappella vocals from all five members.

Cover
The album cover is the image of a band-equipment storage chest used during a concert tour. It includes the number 86 on both sides and "MIA" written on air-freight stickers on the back.

The record labels were custom, showing a bird's nest filled with eggs and hand grenades.

Original pressings of the vinyl double-album had text engraved in the run-out grooves on each side, as had been the band's tradition since their 1975 album One of These Nights. Side 1:  "Is it illegal to yell "Movie!" in a firehouse?"; "Side 2:  "Hello, Federal? ... Ship it!"; Side 3:  "Not Tonight, thanks ..." ; Side 4:  "... I've gotta rest up for my monster".

Track listing

Personnel 

Sourced from original album liner notes.

Eagles
Don Felder – guitars, harmony and backing vocals
Glenn Frey – rhythm guitar, keyboards, vocals
Don Henley – drums, percussion, vocals
Randy Meisner – bass guitar, vocals (1976 shows; "New Kid in Town," "Wasted Time," "Take It to the Limit," "Doolin'-Dalton (Reprise II)," and "Desperado")
Timothy B. Schmit – bass guitar, vocals (1980 shows; all other songs)
Joe Walsh – guitars, keyboards, vocals

Additional musicians
Jage Jackson – rhythm guitar, percussion
Phil Kenzie – alto saxophone on "The Long Run"
Vince Melamed – electric piano on "New Kid in Town"
The Monstertones – backing vocals on "All Night Long"
J. D. Souther – vocals and acoustic guitar on "New Kid in Town"
Joe Vitale – piano, organ, drums, percussion

Production
Bill Szymczyk – production
Ted Jensen – mastering engineer

Charts

Weekly charts

Year-end charts

Certifications

References

1980 live albums
Eagles (band) live albums
Albums produced by Bill Szymczyk
Asylum Records live albums
Elektra Records live albums
Albums recorded at the Santa Monica Civic Auditorium